John Wick: Chapter 4 (stylized as JW4) is a 2023 American neo-noir action thriller film directed by Chad Stahelski and written by Shay Hatten and Michael Finch. The sequel to John Wick: Chapter 3 – Parabellum (2019) and the fourth installment in the John Wick franchise, it stars Keanu Reeves as the title character, alongside a supporting ensemble cast including Donnie Yen, Bill Skarsgård, Laurence Fishburne, Hiroyuki Sanada, Shamier Anderson, Lance Reddick (in one of his final roles), Rina Sawayama, Scott Adkins, and Ian McShane.

Development for a fourth John Wick film was confirmed prior to the release of its predecessor; it was formally announced by Lionsgate in May 2019, who also confirmed Reeves's return. It is the first film in the franchise not to be written by franchise creator Derek Kolstad, with Hatten hired in May 2020, followed by Finch in March 2021. Principal photography took place from June 2021 until October, with filming locations including Berlin, Paris, Osaka, and New York City.

Originally set for release on May 21, 2021, John Wick: Chapter 4 was first delayed due to the COVID-19 pandemic. The film had its premiere at the Odeon Luxe Leicester Square in London on March 6, 2023, and is scheduled to be released in the United States on March 24, by Lionsgate. It received largely positive reviews, who praised its costume design, visual style, Reeves’ performance and the action sequences.

Plot 
In New York City, John Wick prepares to exact his revenge against the High Table while hiding underground with the Bowery King. He travels to Morocco and kills the Elder, the only individual above the High Table. 

Because of this, New York Continental Hotel manager Winston Scott and his concierge Charon are summoned to the Marquis Vincent de Gramont, a senior member of the High Table, who chastises Winston for his failure to assassinate John. To punish Winston, de Gramont strips him of his duties as manager, has the Continental destroyed, and kills Charon. He then travels to Paris and enlists Caine, a blind, retired High Table assassin and old friend of John's, to kill him, threatening to murder Caine's daughter otherwise.
 
John takes refuge at the Osaka Continental, which is run by his friend Shimazu Koji. De Gramont's assassins, led by his right-hand man Chidi, arrive along with Caine to kill John. Akira, Koji's daughter and the hotel's concierge, orders the hotel evacuated, and joins her father, John, and the hotel's staff in fighting off the High Table's assassins. Akira is wounded, while Koji tells John how to escape. On his way out, John fights off another wave of assassins, followed by Caine. They are interrupted by a tracker pursuing John for a contract, nicknamed "Mr. Nobody" by de Gramont, but he lets John go after deciding the contract is insufficient. Akira also escapes, but Koji is killed by Caine.
 
John returns to New York and meets with a vengeful Winston at Charon's gravesite. Winston suggests that John challenge de Gramont to a duel, as winning will free him of his obligation to the High Table. Per the Table's traditions, John can only request a duel on behalf of a crime family; seeing as he previously severed his ties to the Ruska Roma, John travels to their headquarters in Berlin to receive a new crest marking his membership to the syndicate. His adoptive sister Katia agrees to do so in exchange for killing Killa, a German High Table senior who murdered her father. 
 
John finds and kills Killa in his nightclub. Katia then brands John's arm with a Ruska Roma crest, enabling John to formally request a duel with de Gramont through Winston, who requests the New York Continental rebuilt with him reinstated as manager as part of his terms should John win. In Paris, John and de Gramont decide the parameters of their duel, in a meeting moderated by the Harbinger, the Table's emissary. De Gramont nominates a reluctant Caine to fight in his place. The duel is to take place the following sunrise at Sacré-Cœur; the Harbinger informs John that both he and Winston will be executed should he fail to appear on time. 
 
The Bowery King arrives in Paris to give John a weapon and a new ballistic suit. De Gramont attempts to prevent John from arriving to the duel by placing a $40 million contract on his head. John fights off hordes of assassins on his way to Sacré-Cœur, including Mr. Nobody, but the latter stops hunting John after he saves Mr. Nobody's dog from being killed by Chidi. Caine aids John in fighting his way up the stairs leading to the Sacré-Cœur; Chidi nearly kills John, but Mr. Nobody kills him first.
 
John and Caine narrowly reach the summit in time to save Winston. The two duel with pistols; Caine gravely wounds John in the first two rounds. De Gramont asks to personally execute John for the final round, but John, who had not yet fired his gun, shoots and kills de Gramont. The Harbinger declares him free of his debt to the High Table, though John dies peacefully due to his wounds. 

After Winston is reinstated as manager of the Continental, he and the Bowery King attend John’s funeral, having been buried next to his late wife Helen. Sometime later, Akira approaches Caine, seeking to avenge Koji's death.

Cast

 Keanu Reeves as Jardani Jovanovich / Jonathan "John" Wick, a professional hitman and assassin who has gained legendary reputation for his set of skills and is now hunted by the High Table.
 Donnie Yen as Caine, a blind High Table assassin and an old friend of John Wick.
 Bill Skarsgård as the Marquis Vincent de Gramont, a powerful member of the High Table whose position is challenged by John Wick.
 Laurence Fishburne as the Bowery King, a former underground crime boss who was left for dead by the High Table and is now sponsoring John Wick. 
 Hiroyuki Sanada as Shimazu Koji, the manager of the Osaka Continental Hotel and an old friend of John Wick.
 Shamier Anderson as the Tracker / Mr. Nobody, a bounty hunter pursuing Wick.
 Lance Reddick as Charon, the concierge at the Continental Hotel in New York.
 Rina Sawayama as Akira, Koji's daughter and concierge of the Osaka Continental.
 Scott Adkins as Killa, the head of the German Table and an individual who has one thing in common with John Wick: they have the same enemy.
 Ian McShane as Winston Scott, the manager of the New York Continental Hotel and friend of John Wick.

Additionally, Clancy Brown portrays the Harbinger, a high-ranking operative of the High Table; Natalia Tena portrays Katia, John Wick's adoptive sister; while Marko Zaror portrays Chidi, the right-hand man of the Marquis de Gramont. George Georgiou appears as the Elder, the "Man Above the (High) Table", replacing Saïd Taghmaoui from John Wick: Chapter 3 – Parabellum (2019). Bridget Moynahan appears as John's late wife, Helen.

Production

Development
On May 20, 2019, Lionsgate announced John Wick: Chapter 4 via their opt-in "John Wick" text update service, writing, "You have served. You will be of service. John Wick: Chapter 4 is coming – May 21, 2021".

Before the third film's release, director Chad Stahelski confirmed on a Reddit "AMA" thread that there had been discussion for another film, and that he would be involved with the project should the threequel be successful. Despite this announcement back then, it was not confirmed if star Keanu Reeves would return for a new installment. However, he told GQ that he would carry on the role as long as the audience wanted it, saying, "As far as my legs can take me, as far as the audience wants to go."

Stahelski later teased the fourth film on an interview with IndieWire by saying Wick would not end the fourth film in "a happy ending", saying, "John may survive all this shit but at the end of it, there's no happy ending. He's got nowhere to go. Honestly, I challenge you right now, here's a question to you: How do you fucking want me to end it? Do you think he's going to ride off into the fucking sunset? He's killed 300 fucking people and he's just going to [walk away], everything's okay? He's just going to fall in love with a love interest? If you're this fucking guy, if this guy really exist[ed], how is this guy's day going to end? He's fucked for the rest of his life. It's just a matter of time." Additionally, Stahelski teased Winston's fate in the fourth film, saying, "He meant to shoot him. Did he mean to kill him? That's open for interpretation, you can take it one of two ways, and that's kind of where we pick up some of the unanswered questions in John Wick 4." The studio opted to move on from series creator Derek Kolstad and instead hired Shay Hatten to write the script in May 2020. In February, Stahelski brought Ricky Staub and Dan Walser on board to write the film after being impressed with their film Concrete Cowboy. In March 2021, screenwriting duties were passed onto Predators screenwriter Michael Finch.

On May 1, 2020, IndieWire revealed that the fourth film had been delayed to a May 2022 release date following the COVID-19 pandemic and Reeves's commitments to The Matrix Resurrections, which was slated to be released on the same original date window with Wick 4. "The Matrix 4 was only four weeks in when this all happened [production of The Matrix 4 halted]," Stahelski said, "So, Keanu's gotta go finish his commitment up on The Matrix, which is a big deal and which I think will probably take him until the end of the year. Then we have to go into our prep mode and then we'll start. So release dates ... who knows right now."

When the fourth film was announced, Reeves was reportedly revealed to have begun his training course for John Wick 4 and The Matrix Resurrections.

Pre-production
In early August 2020, Lionsgate CEO Jon Feltheimer stated during an earnings call, "We're also busy preparing scripts for the next two installments of our John Wick action franchise, with John Wick 4 slated to hit theaters Memorial Day weekend 2022. We hope to shoot both John Wick 4 and 5 back to back when Keanu becomes available early next year."

In May 2021, it was announced that Rina Sawayama would make her feature film debut in John Wick Chapter 4. She was selected due to the role requiring someone who can do choreography, and Stahelski had seen her music videos for "XS" and "Bad Friend" that feature dance and fighting, respectively. The following month, Laurence Fishburne, Hiroyuki Sanada, Donnie Yen, Bill Skarsgård, Shamier Anderson, and Scott Adkins were cast in the film. Sanada was initially courted to portray Zero in Chapter 3, but dropped out in favor of appearing in Avengers: Endgame. In July 2021, Lance Reddick was confirmed to be reprising his role as Charon, and Ian McShane was confirmed to be reprising his role as Winston. Clancy Brown joined the cast that August.

Filming
Production began on June 28, 2021, in Berlin and Paris, with additional filming to take place in Japan and New York City. On October 27, 2021, principal photography had officially wrapped.

Release
John Wick: Chapter 4 is scheduled to be released on March 24, 2023. Lionsgate officially announced the film during Parabellums opening week, with a scheduled release date of May 21, 2021. The film's release date was delayed to May 27, 2022, due to the COVID-19 pandemic, and then further to March 24, 2023, in part to avoid opening against Top Gun: Maverick. The film had its premiere at the Odeon Luxe Leicester Square in London on March 6, 2023. It also had a special screening at the South by Southwest on March 13, 2023.

Reception

Future
In August 2020, Lionsgate CEO Jon Feltheimer confirmed that a fifth film was being developed alongside John Wick: Chapter 4. While it was initially intended to be shot back-to-back with the fourth installment, in March 2021 Lionsgate opted to delay production and move forward with Chapter 4 first. Keanu Reeves has stated that he will continue making sequels, as long as the films are successful. Reeves and Ian McShane will reprise their respective roles as John Wick and Winston Scott in the upcoming spin-off film Ballerina, starring Ana de Armas as ballerina-assassin Rooney Brown (replacing Unity Phelan from Parabellum). Later Stahelski said that Chapter 4 is the last one for a while: "In our minds, Keanu and I are done for the moment. We're going to give John Wick a rest. I'm sure the studio has a plan. If everyone loves it and it goes kooky, then we'll take a quiet minute."

Notes

References

External links
 
 
 

2023 action thriller films
2020s American films
2020s English-language films
American action thriller films
American neo-noir films
American sequel films
Wick, John
Films directed by Chad Stahelski
Films postponed due to the COVID-19 pandemic
Films produced by Basil Iwanyk
Films scored by Tyler Bates
Films shot in Berlin
Films shot in Japan
Films shot in New York City
Films shot in Paris
Films with screenplays by Shay Hatten
4
Lionsgate films
Summit Entertainment films
Thunder Road Films films